Nikolaos Vokos (1854 – August 7, 1902) was a Greek painter of the Munich School art movement.

Biography 
He was the son of Emmanouil Miaoulis and a grandson of Admiral Andreas Vokos Miaoulis. He was initially enrolled in the Cadet School, but on discovering his passion for painting he left it to study at the Athens School of Fine Arts from 1874 until 1878.  In 1885, after a competition, he won a scholarship to continue his studies in Munich under Nicholaos Gysis, Ludwig Löfftz, and Andreas Müller. He remained in Munich for 16 years, running a painting school, until where he became ill and returned to Athens in 1902. He died on August 7, 1902 at Palaio Faliro, Athens.

Work 
As a painter, he used several motifs. He was especially accomplished in realistic still life. He participated in relatively few exhibitions: Munich 1898, Paris  1900, Athens at the Parnassos Club at 1901, etc. Among his more notable prize-winning paintings are the Fisherman (Ιχθυοπώλης), which won the Chicago Award, Epitrapezion (Επιτραπέζιον) which was bought and exhibited at the palace of the Bavarian prince Regent Luitpold.

References

External links

1854 births
1902 deaths
19th-century Greek painters
Nikolaos
People from Hydra (island)
Munich School
20th-century Greek painters